Southend High School for Girls is a grammar school with academy status situated on Southchurch Boulevard in the east of Southend-on-Sea, Essex, England. It caters for students from the age of 11 through to 18 years old.

Academics

As of 2022, the school's most recent Ofsted inspection was in 2011, when it was judged Outstanding.

The school has a specialism in languages. All Key Stage 3 students study French and German or French and Spanish (replacing Latin in 2002, which is now available as an additional subject studied off-timetable).

The school also offers other additional languages to the students, for example Chinese, Russian or Polish, but these come at a personal expense to the student themselves.

The school achieves excellent results at A level and other examinations, consistently above national averages, in part because of the selective entry system.

In Science, Mathematics, English and Geography all students take a two-year Key Stage 3 qualification allowing them to start their GCSE studies early.

Demographics

According to the school's most recent Ofsted report:

"Most students are from a White British heritage, and a broadly average proportion is from minority ethnic backgrounds. No students are in the early stages of learning English. The proportion of students with special educational needs and/or disabilities is low and the proportion known to be entitled to free school meals is below average."

Notable former pupils

 Prof Lorna Casselton, Professor of Fungal Genetics at the University of Oxford and expert in the sexual behaviour of mushrooms from 1997 to 2003
 Prof Deborah Ashby, Professor of Medical Statistics and Clinical Trials at Imperial College London and expert on Bayesian statistics
 Brigadier Jill Field CBE, Matron-in-Chief of the Army and Director of Defence Nursing Services from 1989 to 1992
 Jo Richardson, Labour MP for Barking from 1974 to 1994
 Sarah Wilhelmy, Former Great Britain international Athlete and representative at the 2000 Summer Olympics
 Ruby Tandoh, runner-up on series four of BBC's The Great British Bake Off in 2013
 Rachel Riley, co-host of Countdown from 2009.

Arson
In April 2003 the school was closed for two days following a fire in an art room started by a student. On the day of the re-opening another fire was started; eventually three students were arrested in connection with the incidents. There was also another fire started in Room 8 on the middle floor of the towerblock. The second fire was started in close proximity to gas pipes. In total three fires were started in the space of a single month leading to several parents withdrawing their daughters from the school.
	 
The school was again attacked in December 2005 causing several thousand pounds worth of damage to the school kitchen and a number of classrooms at the front of the school. The damage was so extensive that the Christmas holiday break was extended for students of years 7 and 8. Reconstruction work took almost a year whilst a new kitchen, dining room and reception area were constructed and a number of classrooms had to be fully refitted.

References

External links 
 
 EduBase

Educational institutions established in 1913
Grammar schools in Southend-on-Sea
Girls' schools in Essex
Academies in Southend-on-Sea
School buildings in the United Kingdom destroyed by arson
1913 establishments in England